Alexander Romario Jesuraj (born 26 July 1996), is an Indian professional footballer who plays as a winger for Chennaiyin in the Indian Super League.

Club career

Youth and early career
Born in Dindigul, Tamil Nadu, Alexander begins his career with  Arrows FC in the Chennai Premier Division at age of 17. He pursued B.A degree in political science from Madras Christian College.

Chennai City
Alexander started his I-League career with Chennai City in 2017. He was widely regarded as an exciting player. He was nicknamed as "Namma Neymar Romario" (Our Neymar Romario). He won I-league title with Chennai City FC in 2018–19 season.

FC Goa
On 23 July 2019, Jesuraj joined Goa on a three-year deal from Chennai City.

Mohun Bagan (loan)
Jesuraj was loaned from Goa to Mohun Bagan. He won his second I-League title with Mohun Bagan in 2019–20 season.

Back to FC Goa
On 22 November 2020, Alexander made his first appearance for Goa in Indian Super League against Bengaluru. Alexander scored his first goal for club on 4 February 2021 against NorthEast United FC, the match ended in 2–2 draw. He made his first continental appearance on 14 April 2021, against Qatari side Al-Rayyan SC in the 2021 AFC Champions League group stage match. He went on to play 5 games for the club in group stage matches.

Career statistics

Club

Honours
Goa
Durand Cup: 2021

References

External links

Player profile at the-aiff.com (AIFF)

Living people
1996 births
People from Dindigul district
Indian footballers
Chennai City FC players
Mohun Bagan AC players
FC Goa players
Association football midfielders
Footballers from Tamil Nadu
Indian Super League players
I-League players